Dewey William Johnson (March 14, 1899 – September 18, 1941) was an American lawyer and politician from Minnesota.  Johnson was born in Minneapolis and attended the local public schools, followed by the University of Minnesota and William Mitchell College of Law (then the YMCA Law School).

After graduation from law school, he began work in the insurance business.  He was elected to the Minnesota House of Representatives in 1929 and served until 1935.  In 1934, he had been an unsuccessful candidate for election to the 74th congress.  After his six-year stint in the Minnesota House, Johnson served as Deputy Commissioner of Insurance and as the state Fire Marshal.  A second Congressional run in 1936 was successful; Johnson served as a member of the Farmer-Labor Party in the 75th congress, (January 3, 1937–January 3, 1939).  However, in 1938 he was defeated for re-election by Oscar Youngdahl, a Republican, and when he again ran in 1940 against Youngdahl he was again defeated.

Johnson resumed his insurance practice in Minneapolis and also operated a retail radio sales business.  He died in Minneapolis in 1941.

References 

1899 births
1941 deaths
Members of the United States House of Representatives from Minnesota
Members of the Minnesota House of Representatives
University of Minnesota alumni
William Mitchell College of Law alumni
Minnesota lawyers
Politicians from Minneapolis
Minnesota Farmer–Laborites
Farmer–Labor Party members of the United States House of Representatives
20th-century American politicians
Lawyers from Minneapolis
20th-century American lawyers
South High School (Minnesota) alumni